Nathalie Léger (born 20 September 1960 in Paris, France) is a writer and the executive director of the Institute for Contemporary Publishing Archives.

Career 
Nathalie Léger was curator of several exhibitions, notably Le Jeu et la Raison, dedicated to Antoine Vitez (Festival d'Avignon 1994), L'Auteur et son éditeur (IMEC, 1998) and the exhibition Roland Barthes, which was held at the Centre Georges-Pompidou in 2002, and in 2007, the exhibition Samuel Beckett, in the same place. She directed the five-volume edition of the Écrits sur le théâtre by Antoine Vitez ( 1994–98) and established, annotated and presented that of the last two courses of Roland Barthes at the Collège de France La Préparation du roman (Seuil-IMEC, 2002).

She is the author of a personal essay entitled Les Vies silencieuses de Samuel Beckett (2006).

Between 2008 and 2018, she published a conceptual trilogy about the lives of women. The first, L'Exposition (2008), was about the Countess of Castiglione and won the Prix Lavinal Printemps des lecteurs in 2009. In 2012, she published  (Suite for Barbara Loden), devoted to the American actress and director Barbara Loden. Since its publication, the book has been critically very successful and was awarded the Prix du Livre Inter on 4 June 2012. In 2018, she published La Robe blanche, about Pippa Bacca.

Bibliography 
 Les Vies silencieuses de Samuel Beckett (2006, Allia).
 L'Exposition (2008, Éditions P.O.L). Exposition, trans. Amanda de Marco (2019).
 Supplément à la vie de Barbara Loden (2012, Éditions P.O.L). Suite for Barbara Loden, trans. Natasha Lehrer and Cécile Menon (2015).
 La Robe blanche (2018, Éditions P.O.L). The White Dress, trans. Natasha Lehrer (2020).
Suivant l'azur (2020, Éditions P.O.L).

Awards and honours 

 2009: Prix Lavinal Printemps des lecteurs for L'Exposition
 2012: Prix du Livre Inter for Supplément à la vie de Barbara Loden

References

External links 
 Nathalie Léger on Babelio
 Nathalie Léger. Cette épaisseur d’outre-tombe on Le Monde (15 May 2016)
 Nathalie Léger Supplément à la vie de Barbara Loden on YouTube
 Nathalie Léger on Éditions P.O.L
 Musique: les choix de Nathalie Léger 4/5 on France Culture
 L'Exposition on Télérama (17 November 2008)

21st-century French non-fiction writers
Prix du Livre Inter winners
1960 births
Living people
21st-century French women writers